The CLH Pipeline System, formerly the Government Pipelines and Storage System (GPSS), is a United Kingdom pipeline system run by CLH. However, several of these facilities were closed before the GPSS was sold in 2015 and a number of the pipelines were mothballed and later abandoned. Earlier the total number of facilities on the GPSS was much larger than 46. For example, in 1989 there were 40 Petroleum Storage Depots in operation plus large numbers of other facilities such as pump-stations, junctions, and ingress and egress points. It is interconnected with some other commercial pipeline systems.

Pre World War II planning
As part of the planning and preparations for World War II, the Air Ministry realised that the ability to distribute aviation fuel to the Royal Air Force (RAF)'s aircraft and petrol to its ground support vehicles was essential to sustaining any battle, in which superiority would be gained mainly in the air. In 1936, however, the RAF only possessed fuel reserves of 8,000 tons. These were at the time estimated to be enough for 10 days of war but in reality would have only represented one day of peak wartime use.

Authorisation was given to build a series of fuel storage depots with semi-buried tanks in them that would be protected against aerial attack.  Initially in 1936 the figure was set at 90,000 tons but this had been increased to 800,000 tons by 1938. By the start of World War II in 1939, a number of these new protected storage depots were already operational. However, no pipelines were constructed until after the war started, with the first being built in 1941.

National pipeline system
With the declaration of war and as pre-planned, the Petroleum Board came into operation with all former staff of the separate petrol companies coming under the Petroleum Board. The entire operation of fuel supplies was controlled from Shell Mex House in London. The programme for building protected storage tanks continued and increased with the bulk of construction being between 1940 and 1942. The value of these protected storage tanks can be seen in that whereas 500,000 tons of above ground tanks were destroyed as a result of German bombing, only two protected storage tanks [8,000 tons], in Poole and Falmouth, were destroyed.

As fuel imports into Great Britain increased it became more difficult for the existing road and rail network to meet the demand to transfer the fuel eastwards and southwards from the west coast ports, the east coast fuel import facilities were closed because of the bombing.  In April 1941 the go ahead was given for the construction of an oil pipeline from Avonmouth, where a large number of new protected storage tanks had been constructed, to the Thames (A/T pipeline).  Concern as to the vulnerability of the fuel import facilities, led to the construction in 1942 of a pipeline linking the import facilities in the Stanlow area with those at Avonmouth.  This was followed by the construction of a pipeline running from off the A/T pipeline to the Southampton area for the stockpiling of fuel for the possible second front (R/H pipeline). During 1943 an entire ring-main linking the River Mersey, the Avonmouth area, the River Thames and up to the Humber area, was constructed. This was later extended into East Anglia to supply both the RAF and the United States Army Air Force (USAAF).

Linked to the GPSS were the cross-channel PLUTO pipelines which ran from the Isle of Wight to Cherbourg (code named BAMBI) and from Dungeness to Boulogne (code named DUMBO). The R/H pipeline had already been constructed but to supply DUMBO a new pipeline was built from the Thames to Dungeness in 1943. The success of the PLUTO was, however, limited with only 8% of the fuel delivered between D-Day and VE Day being via them.  The official history states of them that 'PLUTO contributed nothing to Allied supplies at a time that would have been most valuable' and 'DUMBO was more valuable, but at a time when success was of less importance.'

Post World War II
Immediately following the end of the war, most of the system was mothballed with surplus fuel disposed of, sites were reduced to minimum manning, and the pipelines filled with water. However, this changed with the Cold War and the decision taken to recommission the network. One person working on bringing one previously mothballed storage depot back into operation related how it was buried beneath rubbish and long grass. Two new fuel importation complexes were built in the 1950s, one to the south west of Bristol and one in the Stanlow area. A very large storage depot using salt caverns was constructed in Cheshire for storing both crude and refined oils. On being recommissioned, the cross-Pennines pipeline was found to be badly corroded and in the 1950s a new pipeline was built from the Stanlow area to the Humber.  New storage depots were built on this pipeline and a third new import facility was constructed on the Humber.

The first commercial usage of the system was immediately after the war to supply a depot on the River Severn from Avonmouth. In the early 1950s some aviation fuel was pumped from Avonmouth to a depot on the River Thames to supply Heathrow Airport by road tanker from there. Esso also used the network to pump aviation fuel from the Fawley refinery to the Thames depot to supply Heathrow. The late 1950s also saw a spur off one of the PLUTO pipelines, originally from the Thames to Dungeness, brought back into operation to pump fuel from the Isle of Grain to the Thames Depot.  From there aviation fuel was carried to Heathrow Airport, no longer by road tanker but via the first commercial pipeline which was constructed by Shell-Mex & BP in 1959.

In 1967 an agreement was reached with Conoco for leasing five petroleum storage depots for road loading of ground fuels. These were all supplied from the Immingham refinery which was connected to the GPSS pipeline network. During the late 1970s and early 1980s two commercial road loading facilities and two additional refineries were also connected to the GPSS. There were a substantial number of depots that were not on the pipeline network. In the 1970s most of these were closed down. In the 1980s it was decided by the government that large scale strategic storage of petroleum as a civil reserve was no longer required. The salt cavities and some of the storage depots previously used for civil reserve storage were either closed or leased commercially.

The management of civil storage depots and the pipeline network initially came under the Board of Trade and then in 1942 under the Ministry of Power. This became the Department of Energy in the 1970s. In 1975 the British National Oil Corporation (BNOC) was set up and took over the running of the department's system. In 1985 the government closed BNOC but kept the GPSS and the Oil & Pipelines Agency (OPA) was set up purely to manage the GPSS. Air Ministry storage depots and spur pipelines had been managed by the ministry and later by the Ministry of Defence (MoD) but in 1989 it was decided by the government to merge these sites and pipelines with the rest of the GPSS under the management of OPA. Although the GPSS remained officially secret until the end of the Cold War, knowledge of it was in fact already in the public domain through the publication of various books an papers such as the Official History, Adams' papers and the series of articles in the Petroleum Times - 'Petroleum at War'.

Private-sector usage was encouraged, but limited; the OPA's task was to provide "maximum development of private sector usage of the GPSS, provided this did not impinge upon its primary purpose of supplying the required fuel for defence purposes and did not require capital investment from public funds." As a result, the pipeline was extended and developed to allow connection to all UK-based oil refineries and major fuel processing depots, as well as all major civilian airports (including Heathrow, Gatwick, Stansted and Manchester) during the period of the Cold War. As a result of the 2000 fuel protests, Defence Secretary Geoff Hoon instructed the MoD to plan for extension of the GPSS to beat any future fuel blockade.

Operations
During World War II to protect the pipeline from damage or look for possible leaks, a team of men and women was employed to patrol the pipeline. Each person was responsible for a section of pipeline eight to ten miles long. This was clearly very manpower intensive and later it was possible to use commercial (rather than RAF) helicopters to patrol the pipelines on a fortnightly basis and helicopter landing pads were constructed on the depots. In the 1950s a means of preventing pipeline corrosion known as cathodic protection became available. This applies a voltage to the pipeline such that the natural electrical action which takes place between pipe and soil leading to corrosion is reversed. Cathodic protection was applied to the pipeline system on a rolling programme which started in 1954 and was completed in 1970.

After the war the locations of the pipelines were marked with identification posts with bright yellow roofs with a thick black line. Even so, in March 2000 at Furness Vale near Whaley Bridge, High Peak, Derbyshire one of the lines was cut by workmen.

Privatisation
In May 2012 the Government of the United Kingdom announced plans to sell all or part of the GPSS and legislation to enable it to do so was included in the Energy Act 2013.

Three years after announcing the plan to sell GPSS, on 20 March 2015, the GPSS was acquired by Spanish oil network operator CLH for £82 million. The MoD also signed a contract with CLH for the military to continue to be supplied with fuel via the GPSS. It was stated that over the next ten years the MoD would pay £237 million for the use of the system.  MoD had previously paid nothing for the use of the GPSS and also gained from the surplus of income over expenditure that OPA used to generate from running the GPSS.

The sale did not include the six coastal Oil Fuel Depots owned by the MoD, which continued to be operated and maintained by the residual OPA.

Following its acquisition by CLH, the GPSS was subsequently renamed the CLH Pipeline System. Since CLH have taken over the ownership of the GPSS a number of the pipelines that make up the system have been closed down.

See also
UK oil pipeline network
Oil terminals in the United Kingdom
Petroleum Board

Notes

References

External links

Schematic Map of CLH Pipeline System
GPSS on Secret Bases website
Ministry of Defence (United Kingdom) - Legislation to enable the sale of the Government Pipeline and Storage System, April 2011

Oil pipelines in the United Kingdom
Ministry of Defence (United Kingdom)